Abbey Load is the third studio album from Beatallica. It was released on 16 April 2013. It is the band's first studio album in over four years, since Masterful Mystery Tour was released in late 2009. The album's title was announced on 12 March 2013. Unlike the other Beatallica albums, the songs on this album have the original lyrics written by the Beatles, due to an imposition at Sony Music, the distributor of their label Oglio and owner of the Beatles' catalogue through Sony/ATV Music Publishing. Before, the lyrics were parodies such as "Mean Mr. Mustaine".

Its title is a reference to the Beatles' album Abbey Road and Metallica's album Load. Abbey Road also provides the cover parody (referencing the image of the Beatles crossing Abbey Road in various ways, such as "Kliff McBurtney" wearing bear slippers, and a van with the plate "28KLIFF"), and most of the track list, with opener "Come Together" and the 16-minute medley on the album's Side B. Among the exclusions were "I Want You (She's So Heavy)" - which Beatallica had already spoofed as "Ktulu (He's So Heavy)" - and the George Harrison  compositions "Here Comes the Sun" and "Something", denied the inclusion by his estate.

Track listing

Credits
Jaymz Lennfield- vocals, lyrics, songwriting, rhythm guitar
Grg Hammetson- lead guitar, backing vocals, synthesizer
Kliff McBurtney - bass, backing vocals, acoustic guitar on "Blackbird"
Ringo Larz - drums, "Lou Reed" vocals in "Her Majesty"
Dave Newkid - bass, backing vocals on "The End"
Flemball Rasmartin - background vocals in "Carry That Weight"
Diablo Mysterioso - guitar in "Please Please Me", "Mean Mr. Mustard" and "The End" 
Marshall (Sean Williamson) - guitar in "The End", background vocals in "Carry That Weight"

References

2013 albums
Beatallica albums
Oglio Records albums
2010s comedy albums